Khurshid Rizvi (ڈاکٹرخورشید رضوی) is a Pakistani scholar of languages and an Urdu poet.

Early life
Rizvi was born on 8 December 1940 in Amroha, Muradabad (India) in a Sunni Sadaat family. As a young child, he immigrated with his family to Montgomery in 1948 (now Sahiwal), Punjab (Pakistan). He studied at Islamia High School, and Government High School & finally graduated from Government College, Montgomery in 1959. He moved to the University Oriental College Lahore for higher studies and earned his MA in Arabic in 1961. Later, he got his Ph.D. in Arabic from the same university in 1981.

Publications
Rizvi has authored and edited books in many languages on a range of subjects including seven poetry collections to date. He has also done substantial translation work which includes his translation of the Federal Shariat Court Judgement on Bank Interest (Riba) for the Islamic Development Bank, Jeddah, Saudi Arabia. Rizvi's most celebrated research work so far has been his book entitled: Arabi Adab Qabl az Islam عربی ادب قبل از اسلام (Pre-Islamic Arabic Literature). This is the first detailed critical review of pre-Islamic literature in the Urdu language. 

His publications include:

 Shakh-e-Tanha (poetry) شاخ تنہا
Sarabon ke Sadaf (poetry) سرابوں کے صدف
 Rayegan (poetry) رایگاں
 Imkan (poetry) امکان 
Yakja (poetry) یکجا 
Deryaab (poetry) دیریاب .
Nisbatain (poetry)  نسبتیں.
Taleef (essays) تالیف.
Atraaf (essays) اطراف
Baazdeed (sketches) بازدید
Tareekh-e-uloom mein Tehzeeb-e-Islaami ka Muqam (Urdu translation from Arabic) تاریخ علوم میں تہذیب اسلامی کامقام
Hukm al-Mahkamat-al-Shar'iyyah (translation from English into Arabic of the judgment of the Federal Shari'at Court of Pakistan on bank interest) "حكم المحكمة الشرعية الاتحادية الباكستانية بشأن الفائدة (الربا)" .
Qala'id al-Juman  (critical editing of a 13th-century Arabic manuscript) "قلائد الجمان في فرائد شعراء هذا الزمان" 13.
Arabi Adab Qabl az Islam- Part I (a detailed history of pre-Islamic Arabic literature) عربی ادب قبل از اسلام - حصہ اول

Career
Rizvi turned to teaching at the age of 19 as a lecturer in Arabic at Government College Bahawalpur, from where he moved to Government College Sargodha and continued up to 1984 when he became the principal of Government Ambala Muslim College Sargodha. In 1985 he proceeded on deputation to the Islamic Research Institute, International Islamic University, Islamabad where he served as Chief Bureau of Translation for six years. In 1991 he became Head of the Department of Arabic at Government College Lahore (now a university), opting for an early retirement in 1995 to focus on his research pursuits.

In 2015, he was given the Aalmi Frogh-e-Urdu Adab Award, for promoting Urdu Literature worldwide, by Majlis Frogh-e-Urdu Adab, an organization from Qatar.

References

Living people
Muhajir people
Pakistani poets
1942 births
People from Amroha district
Pakistani literary critics
Linguists from Pakistan
Academic staff of the Government College University, Lahore
Urdu-language non-fiction writers
Linguists of Urdu
Urdu critics
Academic staff of Lahore University of Management Sciences
Oriental College alumni
Historians of Arabic literature
Pakistani  literary historians